Tundra is an unincorporated community in Van Zandt County, Texas, United States. According to the Handbook of Texas, the community had a population of 34 in 2000. It is located within the Dallas/Fort Worth Metroplex.

History
Tundra was first known as Burns Neighborhood after a family surnamed Burns who lived in the area. It was then changed to Cool Springs in August of 1874, when Primitive Baptist pastor Rev. John R. Martin moved here and built his church near the headwaters of Alligator Creek. The church currently stands somewhere to the west of its original site since the 1980s. He then built a gin west of the church in a bed of sand between two sandy hills in 1881, causing it to be renamed Pull Tight because of how difficult it was to enter it. Its name was then changed again to Lone Star in the 1880s. Wade Fisher opened his business in the community in 1896 and requested a post office be built. A post office was then established in 1899 and remained in operation until 1905 when it was replaced by a rural mail route. It was renamed once more to Tundra because the appearance of the area where the community stands resembles tundra. The 1936 county highway map showed two churches, a cemetery, a seasonal industry, several businesses, and scattered houses in the community. The population went up to 184 in the 1930s then plummeted to 40 in 1949. It continued to go down to 24 in 1964 with two churches and a business. The population went up to 34 in 2000.

Geography

Education
Lone Star school was established in Tundra in the 1880s. It had 131 students enrolled in 1904. It continued to operate in 1936. Since the 1950s, the community has been served by the Canton Independent School District.

References

Unincorporated communities in Van Zandt County, Texas
Unincorporated communities in Texas